Gėlainiai is a village in Kėdainiai district municipality, in Kaunas County, in central Lithuania. According to the 2011 census, the village has a population of 13 people. The village is located 0.5 km from Dotnuva, by Vilnius-Šiauliai railway. There is Akademija cemetery in Gėlainiai.

Demography

References

Villages in Kaunas County
Kėdainiai District Municipality